The Bucksbaum Award was established in 2000 by the Bucksbaum Family Foundation and the Whitney Museum of American Art. It is awarded biannually "to honor an artist, living and working in the United States, whose work demonstrates a singular combination of talent and imagination." The $100,000 prize is the world's largest award given to an individual visual artist.

The Bucksbaum Award is always give to an artist whose work is displayed in that year's Whitney Biennial, a showcase for young and lesser known American artists.  The award recognizes an artist who "has the potential to make a lasting impact on the history of American art."

Previous Bucksbaum laureates include:
 2000 Paul Pfeiffer
 2002 Irit Batsry
 2004 Raymond Pettibon
 2006 Mark Bradford
 2008 Omer Fast
 2010 Michael Asher
 2012 Sarah Michelson
 2014 Zoe Leonard
 2019 Tiona Nekkia McClodden
Previous Bucksbaum jurors include:

 2019 David Breslin
 2019 Ryan N. Dennis
 2019 Rujeko Hockley
 2019 René Morales
 2019 Jane Panetta
 2019 Scott Rothkopf
 2019 Lumi Tan

References

External links
Official Webpage

Contemporary art awards
Awards established in 2000
American visual arts awards